The following lists contain the princes consort recorded in the imperial genealogy and chronicles.

Daughters of the emperors of the Song dynasty

Daughters of Emperor Xuanzu

Daughters of Emperor Taizu

Daughters of emperor Taizong

Daughters of Emperor Renzong of Song

Daughters of Emperor Yingzong of Song

Daughters of Emperor Shenzong of Song

Daughters of Emperor Zhezong

Daughters of Emperor Huizong of Song

Daughters of Emperor Ningzong

Daughters of Emperor Lizong

Daughters of Emperor Duzong

Daughters of imperial princes

Sons of Emperor Xuanzu

Sons of Emperor Taizu of Song

Sons of Emperor Taizong

Sons of Emperor Yingzong

Sons of Emperor Shenzong of Song

Sons of Emperor Huizong of Song

References

Song dynasty
Princes
Royal consorts
Husbands of national leaders